The FIBA Under-18 Asian Championship refers to the under-18 basketball championship for the International Basketball Federation's FIBA Asia zone. The event used to be known as the Asian Basketball Confederation Juniors Championship. The top four finishers qualify for the FIBA Under-19 Basketball World Cup.

Summary

Medal table

Participating nations

Under-19 World Cup record

See also
FIBA Asia Cup
FIBA Under-16 Asian Championship
FIBA Under-19 Basketball World Cup
FIBA Under-18 Women's Asian Championship

References
FIBA Asia

 
Basketball competitions in Asia between national teams
Asia
Asian youth sports competitions
Asia Under-18 Championship